SM UB-76 was a German Type UB III submarine or U-boat in the German Imperial Navy during World War I. She was commissioned into the German Imperial Navy on 23 September 1917 as SM UB-76.

 
UB-76 was serving in the Training Flotilla. On 12 February 1919 she was surrendered in accordance with the requirements of the Armistice with Germany and broken up in Rochester in 1922.

Construction

She was built by Blohm & Voss of Hamburg and following just under a year of construction, launched at Hamburg on 5 May 1917. UB-76 was commissioned later that same year under the command of Kptlt. Erich Gerth. Like all Type UB III submarines, UB-76 carried 10 torpedoes and was armed with a  deck gun. UB-76 had a displacement of  while surfaced and  when submerged. Her engines enabled her to travel at  when surfaced and  when submerged.

References

Notes

Citations

Bibliography 

 

German Type UB III submarines
World War I submarines of Germany
U-boats commissioned in 1917
1917 ships
Ships built in Hamburg